Love Bite is a 2012 British comedy horror film directed by Andy De Emmony, based on a screenplay by Cris Cole and Ronan Blaney. The film revolves around a mysterious traveller girl who is suspected of being a werewolf. It stars Jessica Szohr, Ed Speleers, Luke Pasqualino and Timothy Spall. It was released on 9 November 2012.

Plot
School is over and summer has begun in the dead-end seaside town of Rainmouth. While Jamie's friends seem to be happy working in the local pie factory by day and looking for sex by night, Jamie is bored out of his mind, running his pot-head mother's B&B. He's desperate to get out of there. But when he meets beautiful, smart and sexy American traveler Juliana at a party, he's smitten - the world is not so small after all. But soon after Juliana's arrival, strange things start happening. One of the local teens goes missing at a party. Then, another. Jamie is warned by an enigmatic stranger that a werewolf is in town - and preying solely on virgin flesh! The only way to be safe seems to be to pop your cherry. As the locals are picked off one by one, the boys fear that a werewolf is indeed after them. And for all their talk, it turns out none of them have ever had sex before... Pretty soon, everyone is dying to get laid.

Cast
Jessica Szohr as Juliana
Ed Speleers as Jamie
Timothy Spall as Sid
Luke Pasqualino as Kevin
Kierston Wareing as Natalie
Imogen Toner as Mandy
Robert Pugh as Sergeant Rooney
Paul Birchard as Reverend Lynch
Adam Leese as Malik
Ben Keaton as Father John
Robin Morrissey as Bruno
Daniel Kendrick as Spike

Production
Shooting for Love Bite took place in Clacton-on-Sea, Essex, Glasgow, Largs, Millport, Cumbrae and near North Berwick, East Lothian. Filming started on 15 September 2011.

The film wrapped on 14 November 2011, after a five-week shoot in Scotland.

Design

Creature effects
Matt Wavish, writing for the Horror Cult Films website and giving the movie only 2.5 stars out of 10 in his review, was one of few reviewers who admired the werewolf effects: "When the werewolf does finally appear, it is quite cool. Clever lighting and camera angles hide the films low budget, and enable the rather large monster to actually look impressive for most of the time."

Reviewer Karl De Mesa mourned the underabundance of werewolf sightings: "when we do see the beast the darn CGI makes it look like this one might just fall into the B-movie bin."

Reviewer Ellis Whitehouse expressed some outrage: "The wolf itself is a disgustingly ugly piece of CGI work, with it changing size and shape as the scenes progress, one minute it'll be twice the size a human with the fattest head in existence, next it'll be a puny mongrel cowering in front of a car on the road."

Marketing
De Emmony shopped Love Bite at the American Film Market 2011 event, allegedly hoping to appeal to the audience of The Inbetweeners Movie.

The movie's tagline is "Dying...to get laid." Two official trailers were released.

Release
The film was released on 9 November 2012.

Reception 
Movie reviews were mixed. Michael Juvinall of the Horror Society liked it - "a clever mix of horror and humor" - with the proviso, "We don't see too much of the werewolf in the film and what we do see is CGI, which was a little disappointing for me." A reviewer for GMA News Online was also mostly positive: "Add a generous tone of comedy to this naughty UK horror movie and what you've got are well-sketched characters and great plot potential that, unfortunately, just drags in the execution. There's a lot of side stories here that never get developed and left unresolved like stray threads. For all its faults though, Love Bite is as entertaining as its mix of supernatural and sex promises. Credit the young actors for this. There's genuine chemistry between Szohr and Speleers..."

Reviewer Adam Cook wrote, "Love Bite is a risible British horror-comedy that spectacularly fails to deliver either horror or comedy." Horrornews.net reviewer Lizzie Duncan "found none of the main characters that likeable, and this is the key reason why the entire thing seemed to drag on (despite being a relatively short film). ... The whole film is rather vile and crude..." Ellis Whitehouse, giving 1 out of 10 points, begins by referencing Shaun of the Dead and Zombieland and asks, "Is Love Bite the latest in an emerging trend of comedy-horror triumphs? No; it is the exact opposite"; he calls the script "pathetic" and the dialogue "basic, uninspiring, unintelligent and down-right insulting."

References

External links
 
 

2012 films
2012 comedy horror films
2010s sex comedy films
2010s teen comedy films
2010s teen horror films
British comedy horror films
British sex comedy films
British teen comedy films
British teen horror films
Films about virginity
Films shot in East Lothian
Films shot in Essex
Teen sex comedy films
British werewolf films
2010s English-language films
2010s British films